Lieutenant-Colonel Sir Rhys Llewellyn, 2nd Baronet,  (9 March 191025 April 1978) was a Welsh mining executive, soldier, author and dignitary.

He was born in Aberdare, South Wales, the son of Sir David Llewellyn, 1st Baronet, a colliery owner, and his wife, Magdalene Anne, Lady Llewellyn ( Harries).

Educated at Oundle School and Trinity College, Cambridge, he was the Managing Director of Graigola Merthyr from 1934 to 1947; Master of the Brecon and Talybont Foxhounds from 1936 to 1940; an officer in the Welsh Guards during World War II; and High Sheriff of Glamorgan from 1950 to 1951.

Death
Sir Rhys Llewellyn, 2nd Baronet, died unmarried on 25 April 1978, aged 68.

References

1910 births
1978 deaths
Alumni of Trinity College, Cambridge
Baronets in the Baronetage of the United Kingdom
High Sheriffs of Glamorgan
Masters of foxhounds in Wales
People from Aberdare
People educated at Oundle School
20th-century Welsh businesspeople
Welsh Guards officers